Courcy (in the past sometimes spelled Courci etc.) is the name or part of the name of several communes in France:

Courcy, Calvados, in the Calvados département
Courcy, Manche, in the Manche département
Courcy, Marne, in the Marne département
Courcy-aux-Loges, in the Loiret département

Courcy is the name or part of the name of:
Robert De Coucy or Courcy, architect of Reims Cathedral, and his father of the same name.
Richard de Courcy, a Norman baron.
John de Courcy and many other members of this important medieval Anglo-Norman family,
 including 36 male de Courcy who have held the Irish title of Baron Kingsale.
John de Courcy (disambiguation)
William de Courcy (disambiguation)
De Courcy Island, near Nanaimo, British Columbia, Canada